David Goffin was the defending champion, but he did not participate this year.

Nikoloz Basilashvili won the tournament. He defeating Andrey Kuznetsov in the final, after saving three match points.

Seeds

Draw

Finals

Top half

Bottom half

External links
 Main Draw
 Qualifying Draw

References

Sport 1 Open - Singles